John Hobson Matthews (1858–1914) was a Roman Catholic historian, archivist and solicitor.

Biography 
John Hobson Matthews was born in Croydon in 1858, to Emma Hobson from Great Grimsby and his father from St. Ives. He attended schools in Blackheath and Cambridge and worked in Malta for a short period with a shipping firm. Matthews joined the Roman Catholic church in 1877 and became a solicitor in 1889, subsequently working in Cardiff. As a keen linguist, he edited Emynau Catholig (English: 'Catholic Hymns'), translated Ffordd y Groes ('The way of the cross') and joined the Welsh Bardic Gorsedd. Matthews also edited the Cardiff Records, being materials for a history of the County Borough from the earliest times (1898-1911) and wrote a report on the Monmouthshire County Council records in 1905. He was involved in the transactions of the Cardiff Naturalists Society and, more significantly, the Catholic Record Society, being among the original members of this society.

Matthews understood Maltese, Cornish, Irish and Welsh. He married Alice Mary Gwyn-Hughes in 1892, who bore him four sons and two daughters.

He died in Ealing on 23 January 1914.

Other notable works 
 A History of the parishes of St. Ives, Lelant, Towednack, and Zennor (London, 1892) - published by Matthews
 Martin Cock's Guide to St. Ives  (St. Ives, 1906) - edited by Mathews
 Yr Hen grefydd a'r grefydd newydd. Sef dadl … am yr Eglwys Gatholig … Wedi ei gyfieithu i'r Gymraeg gan … J. H. Jones (Cardiff, 1889) - prepared by Matthews
 The Life and Memorials of Saint Teilo (Preston, 1893) - prepared by Matthews
 The Vaughans of Courtfield: a study in Welsh genealogy (London, 1912) - based on Matthews' findings

References 

https://biography.wales/article/s-MATH-HOB-1858

Further reading 
 The Tablet a weekly newspaper and review, London, 31 January 1914
 Handlist of Manuscripts in the National Library of Wales, 1940
 Cardiff Naturalists' Society: Report and Transactions, xxxiii.

20th-century Welsh historians
1858 births
1914 deaths
Contributors to the Catholic Encyclopedia
19th-century Welsh historians